Chella   Indian Actor,  You Tuber.

Places 
Serra de chella (or Serra de Chela), mountain range in south-central Angola
Vaikunda Chella Pathi,  one among the oldest Nizhal Thangals in the Western Kanyakumari district, India
Chella (mountains), a range of mountains in Angola
Chella, Valencia, a municipality known as Xella in Valencian

People 
Chella Choi (born 1990), South Korean professional golfer
Chella Man (born 1998), American YouTuber, actor, model, and artist
Chella Pillai, 1955 Tamil-language comedy-drama film directed by M. V. Raman

Others 
Chilla-nashini, a Sufi practice of penance and solitude
Chellah (also known as Sala), a complex of ancient and medieval ruins on the outskirts of Rabat, Morocco